Bobby F. Knight (April 30, 1929 – May 23, 2008) was an American professional basketball player. Knight played in the American Basketball League between 1947 and 1953, winning a league championship with the Manchester British-Americans in the 1952–53 season. He also played in two games for the New York Knicks in the National Basketball Association at the start of the 1954–55 NBA season. During the late 1940s and early 1950s, Knight played on-and-off for the Harlem Globetrotters.

References

1929 births
2008 deaths
American Basketball League (1925–1955) players
American men's basketball players
Basketball players from Hartford, Connecticut
Forwards (basketball)
Guards (basketball)
Harlem Globetrotters players
New York Knicks players
Basketball players from Springfield, Massachusetts
Undrafted National Basketball Association players